Kelenföldi Textilgyár Sport Egyesület was a Hungarian football club from the town of Kelenföld, Budapest, Hungary.

History
Kelenföldi Textilgyár Sport Egyesület debuted in the 1948–49 season of the Hungarian League and finished ninth.

Name Changes 
1926–1928: Vespag
1928–1942: Goldberger Sport Egyesület
1942–1945: Bethlen Gábor SE
1945–1950: Goldberger Sport Egyesület
1950–1951: Kelenföldi Textil
1951–1956: Vörös Lobogó Keltex SK
1956–1968: Goldberger Sport Egyesület
1968–1988: Kelenföldi Textilgyár Sport Egyesület
1988–1996: Kelenföldi Goldberger SE
1996: merger with Kelenföldi TE

References

External links
 Profile

Football clubs in Hungary
Defunct football clubs in Hungary
1920 establishments in Hungary